Neuilly-sur-Seine (literally 'Neuilly on Seine'), also known simply as Neuilly, is a commune in the département of Hauts-de-Seine in France, just west of Paris. Immediately adjacent to the city, the area is composed of mostly select residential neighbourhoods, as well as many corporate headquarters and a handful of foreign embassies. It is the wealthiest and most expensive suburb of Paris.

Together with the 16th and 7th arrondissement of Paris, the town of Neuilly-sur-Seine forms the most affluent and prestigious residential area in the whole of France. It has the 2nd highest average household income in France, at €112,504 per year (in 2020).

History
Originally, Pont de Neuilly was a small hamlet under the jurisdiction of Villiers, a larger settlement mentioned in medieval sources as early as 832 and now absorbed by the commune of Levallois-Perret. It was not until 1222 that the little settlement of Neuilly, established on the banks of the Seine, was mentioned for the first time in a charter of the Abbey of Saint-Denis: the name was recorded in Medieval Latin as Portus de Lulliaco, meaning "Port of Lulliacum". In 1224 another charter of Saint-Denis recorded the name as Lugniacum. In a sales contract dated 1266, the name was also recorded as Luingni.

In 1316, however, in a ruling of the parlement of Paris, the name was recorded as Nully. In a document dated 1376, the name was again recorded as Nulliacum (the Medieval Latin version of Nully). Then in the following centuries the name recorded alternated between Luny and Nully, and it is only after 1648 that the name was definitely set as Nully.

Various explanations and etymologies have been proposed to explain these discrepancies in the names of Neuilly recorded over the centuries. The original name of Neuilly may have been Lulliacum or Lugniacum, and that it was only later corrupted into Nulliacum / Nully. Some interpret Lulliacum or Lugniacum as meaning "estate of Lullius (or Lunius)", probably a Gallo-Roman landowner. This interpretation is based on the many placenames of France made up of the names of Gallo-Roman landowners and suffixed with the traditional placename suffix "-acum". Other researchers, however, object that it is unlikely that Neuilly owes its name to a Gallo-Roman patronym, because during the Roman occupation of Gaul the area of Neuilly was inside the large Forest of Rouvray, of which the Bois de Boulogne is all that remains today, and was probably not a settlement.

These researchers contend that it is only after the fall of the Roman Empire and the Germanic invasions that the area of Neuilly was deforested and settled. Thus, they think that the name Lulliacum or Lugniacum comes from the ancient Germanic word lund meaning "forest", akin to Old Norse lundr meaning "grove", to which the placename suffix "-acum" was added. The Old Norse word lundr has indeed left many placenames across Europe, such as the city of Lund in Sweden, the Forest of the Londe in Normandy, or the many English placenames containing "lound", "lownde", or "lund" in their name, or ending in "-land". This interesting theory, however, fails to explain why the "d" of lund is missing in Lulliacum or Lugniacum.

Concerning the discrepancy in names over the centuries, the most probable explanation is that the original name Lulliacum or Lugniacum was later corrupted into Nulliacum / Nully by inversion of the consonants, perhaps under the influence of an old Celtic word meaning "swampy land, boggy land" (as was the land around Neuilly-sur-Seine in ancient times) which is found in the name of many French places anciently covered with water, such as Noue, Noë, Nouan, Nohant, etc. Or perhaps the consonants were simply inverted under the influence of the many settlements of France called Neuilly (a frequent place name whose etymology is completely different from the special case of Neuilly-sur-Seine).

Until the French Revolution, the settlement was often referred to as Port-Neuilly, but at the creation of French communes in 1790 the "Port" was dropped and the newly born commune was named simply Neuilly.

On 1 January 1860, the city of Paris was enlarged by annexing neighbouring communes. On that occasion, a part of the territory of Neuilly-sur-Seine was annexed by the city of Paris, and forms now the neighbourhood of Ternes, in the 17th arrondissement of Paris.

On 11 January 1867, part of the territory of Neuilly-sur-Seine was detached and merged with a part of the territory of Clichy to create the commune of Levallois-Perret.

On 4 June 1878, the Synagogue de Neuilly was founded on Rue Ancelle, the oldest synagogue in the Paris suburbs.

On 2 May 1897, the commune name officially became Neuilly-sur-Seine (meaning "Neuilly upon Seine"), in order to distinguish it from the many communes of France also called Neuilly. Most people, however, continue to refer to Neuilly-sur-Seine as simply "Neuilly". During the 1900 Summer Olympics, it hosted the basque pelota events.

The American Hospital of Paris was founded in 1906.

In 1919, the Treaty of Neuilly was signed with Bulgaria in Neuilly-sur-Seine to conclude its role in World War I.

In 1929, the Bois de Boulogne, which was previously divided between the communes of Neuilly-sur-Seine and Boulogne-Billancourt, was annexed in its entirety by the city of Paris.

Politics

Neuilly is one of the most right-wing towns in France; regularly voting for the candidate of the traditional right in landslide margins. Former president Nicolas Sarkozy was once mayor of Neuilly. Amidst a poor national showing of 20%, Neuilly gave right-wing candidate François Fillon 65% of its vote in the first round of the 2017 presidential election.

Logos of the city council

Population

The population data in the table and graph below refer to the commune of Neuilly-sur-Seine proper, in its geography at the given years. The commune of Neuilly-sur-Seine ceded part of its territory to the new commune of Levallois-Perret in 1866.

Main sites
It was the site of the Château de Neuilly, an important royal residence during the July Monarchy.

Transport
Neuilly-sur-Seine is served by three stations on Paris Métro Line 1: Porte Maillot (with a direct access to RER line C), Les Sablons and Pont de Neuilly.

RATP Bus service includes the lines 43, 73, 82, 93, 157, 158, 163, 164, 174 

Night Bus lines include N11 and N24.

Economy
Located near France's main business district La Défense, Neuilly-sur-Seine also hosts several corporate headquarters:
Bureau Veritas, Chanel, Marathon Media, JCDecaux, Thales Group, M6 Group, Sephora, PricewaterhouseCoopers France, Parfums Christian Dior (in 2019), Orangina France, Grant Thornton International France.

Education

Public schools in Neuilly:
 Eight écoles maternelles (preschools): Achille Peretti, Charcot, Dulud, Gorce-Franklin, Michelis, Poissoniers, Roule, Saussaye
 Ten elementary schools: Charcot A, Charcot B, Gorce-Franklin, Huissiers, Poissoniers, Peretti, Michelis A, Michelis B, Saussaye A, and Saussaye B
 Two lower secondary schools: Collège André Maurois and Collège Théophile Gautier.
 Collège et Lycée Pasteur
 Lycée Saint-James
 Lycée professionnel Vassily kandinsky

Domestic private schools:
 École primaire Sainte-Croix 
 École primaire Sainte-Marie 
 École primaire Saint-Dominique
 École Saint-Pierre / Saint Jean 
 Collège Saint-Pierre / Saint-Jean 
 Collège et Lycée Sainte-Croix
 Collège et Lycée Sainte-Marie
 Collège et Lycée Saint-Dominique
 Lycée professionnel Georges Guérin

International private schools:
Liceo Español Luis Buñuel, Spanish international secondary and baccalaureate school
Marymount School, Paris, a Catholic, co-educational, day school for 2-14 year olds

Post-secondary:
 Université de Paris IV-Sorbonne CELSA
 Institut Européen des Affaires
 École supérieure de Santé

Notable residents 
Adrien Étienne Gaudez, French sculptor
Ahmad Shah Qajar, the last king of Iran's Qajar dynasty
Alex Goude, actor and television host 
Albert Uderzo, co-creator, writer and illustrator of Asterix (1927–2020)
Alexander Glazunov, Russian composer
Anaïs Nin, author and diarist, born in Neuilly-sur-Seine
Anatole Litvak (1902–1974), filmmaker
André Beaufre, French general
Annie Fargé, actress, theatrical producer and manager. Died here.
Anthony Beltoise, racing driver
Aristotle Onassis died on 15 March 1975 at the American Hospital
Arthur Zagre, footballer
Bernard Blossac, fashion illustrator.
Bette Davis, non-resident, died at the American Hospital
Carole Bouquet, actress
Charles Frédéric Girard (1822–1895), ichthyologist and herpetologist, died in Neuilly
Christoph H. Müller musician, composer, co-founder of Neotango band Gotan Project
Corentin Moutet, tennis player
David Servan-Schreiber (1961–2011)
Diane Leyre, French model and Miss France 2022
Dominique Strauss-Kahn (born 25 April 1949)
Eça de Queirós, Portuguese writer
Édith Piaf, French singer
Edward VIII, King of the United Kingdom and the Dominions of the British Empire, and Emperor of India.
France Gall, French singer
Francoise Gilot, Painter, Picasso's lover 1943-1953, mother of two of his children.
François Truffaut, French film director, actor
Françoise Bettencourt Meyers, Liliane Bettencourt's daughter
Guy-Manuel de Homem-Christo, half of music duo Daft Punk
Ilona Mitrecey, Eurodance artist
Jacqueline François (1922–2009), chanson singer
Jacques Benoit, scientist
Jacques Prévert, poet and screenwriter
Jacques Zwobada, French sculptor
Jean d'Ormesson, French novelist member of the Académie française
Jean de La Fontaine, French poet and fabulist
Jean-Paul Belmondo, French actor
Jean Raspail, French writer
Jean Riboud (1919–1985) French corporate executive and former chairman of Schlumberger
Joachim Murat, Prince of Pontecorvo, aristocrat
Jonathan Bru, footballer
Joseph Haim Sitruk (1944-2016), former Chief Rabbi of France.
Karl Lagerfeld, German fashion designer
Liliane Bettencourt, L'Oréal heiress 
Ludovic Valbon, rugby player
Marcel Duchamp, artist
María Félix, Mexican actress 
Marie Angliviel de la Beaumelle, French glass maker and Italian countess
Marine Le Pen, French politician and president of the Front National
Martin Solveig, French electro-house DJ
Mary Wollstonecraft, English writer
Max Le Verrier (1819–1973), sculptor, born here.
Prince Michel of Bourbon-Parma, died here
Michel Berger, singer and songwriter.
Mireille Mathieu, chanson singer, has been a resident since 1965
Natalie Barney, American heiress 
King Nicholas I of Montenegro and his family
Nicolas Sarkozy, former President of France; mayor of Neuilly-sur-Seine from 1983 to 2002
Olivier Missoup, rugby player
Paul Grimault, animator
Pierre Ramond, string theorist
Quincy Jones, musician, composer, producer
René Semelaigne (1855–1934), biographer
Roger Martin du Gard, winner of the 1937 Nobel Prize for Literature
Sandra Boëlle, politician
Screamin' Jay Hawkins, Shock rock musician
Sophie Marceau, French actress
Véronique Azan, French dancer
Vittorio De Sica, Italian actor and film director
Wallis Simpson, American socialite and wife of King Edward VIII.
Wassily Kandinsky, Russian Abstract-Expressionist artist
Zizi Lambrino, first wife of the later King Carol II of Romania
Cecile Paul Simon, composer

Twin towns – sister cities

Neuilly-sur-Seine is twinned with:
 Hanau, Germany (1964–2002)
 Uccle, Belgium (from 1981)
 Windsor, England, United Kingdom (from 1955)

See also

Communes of the Hauts-de-Seine department
 Neuilly-Auteuil-Passy
Neuilly sa mère!, 2009 film set in Neuilly-sur-Seine

References

External links

 Neuilly-sur-Seine city council website

 
Venues of the 1900 Summer Olympics
Communes of Hauts-de-Seine